Babella yabei is a species of sea snail, a marine gastropod mollusk in the family Pyramidellidae, the pyrams and their allies. The species is one of twelve known species in the Babella genus of gastropods.

Distribution

Marine

References

External links
 To World Register of Marine Species

Pyramidellidae
Gastropods described in 1936